Qorqi-ye Olya (also Romanized as Qorqī-ye ‘Olyā; also known as Qorqī and Qarqī) is a village in Tabadkan Rural District, in the Central District of Mashhad County, Razavi Khorasan Province, Iran. At the 2006 census, its population was 1,098, in 279 families.

References 

Populated places in Mashhad County